Alan Keane may refer to:

Alan Keane (Gaelic footballer) (active since 2001), Irish Gaelic football player
Alan Keane (soccer) (born 1984), Irish footballer

See also
Alan Keen (1937–2011), British politician